These are the official results of the Women's Triple Jump event at the 1999 World Championships in Seville, Spain. There were a total number of 26 participating athletes, with the final held on Tuesday 24 August 1999.

Medalists

Schedule
All times are Central European Time (UTC+1)

Abbreviations
All results shown are in metres

Qualification
 Held on Sunday 22 August 1999 with the mark set at 14.20 metres

Final

References
 IAAF
 Results
 trackandfieldnews

D
Triple jump at the World Athletics Championships
1999 in women's athletics